The men's ISSF 50 meter pistol competition at the 2000 Summer Olympics was held on 19 September. There were 36 competitors from 27 nations. Nations had been limited to two shooters each since the 1952 Games. Tanyu Kiryakov won, becoming the first shooter to win Olympic gold medals in both this event and 10 metre air pistol. 2.7 points behind, Igor Basinski won his fourth Olympic medal (third in this event—the third man to earn three in the free pistol—and second in the 2000 Games, after a bronze in the 10 metre air pistol). Kiryakov's gold was Bulgaria's first free pistol victory, and the first medal of any color in the event for the nation since 1980. Martin Tenk's bronze was the Czech Republic's first medal in the event.

Background

This was the 20th appearance of the ISSF 50 meter pistol event. The event was held at every Summer Olympics from 1896 to 1920 (except 1904, when no shooting events were held) and from 1936 to 2016; it was open to women from 1968 to 1980. 1896 and 1908 were the only Games in which the distance was not 50 metres; the former used 30 metres and the latter 50 yards.

All eight finalists from the 1996 Games returned: gold medalist Boris Kokorev of Russia, silver medalist (and 1988 bronze medalist) Igor Basinski of Belarus, bronze medalist Roberto Di Donna of Italy, fourth-place finisher (and 1992 gold medalist) Kanstantsin Lukashyk of Belarus, fifth-place finisher Vigilio Fait of Italy, sixth-place finisher (and 1992 silver and 1984 bronze medalist and 1988 and 1992 finalist) Wang Yifu of China, seventh-place finisher Martin Tenk of the Czech Republic, and eighth-place finisher Sergio Sánchez of Guatemala. Also returning was 1992 finalist Tanyu Kiryakov of Bulgaria. The 1998 world championship podium was Franck Dumoulin of France, Hans-Jürgen Bauer-Neumaier of Germany, and Basinski; all three were competing in Sydney.

Kazakhstan and Namibia each made their debut in the event. The United States made its 18th appearance, most of any nation, having missed only the 1900 event and the boycotted 1980 Games.

Kiryakov used a Hämmerli 152.

Competition format

The competition featured two rounds, qualifying and final. The qualifying round was the same as the previous competitions: each shooter fired 60 shots, in 6 series of 10 shots each, at a distance of 50 metres. The target was round, 50 centimetres in diameter, with 10 scoring rings. Scoring for each shot was up to 10 points, in increments of 1 point. The maximum score possible was 600 points. The top 8 shooters advanced to a final; ties necessary for qualifying were broken by 6th-series score, while other ties were not broken. They shot an additional series of 10 shots, with the score added to their qualifying round score to give a 70-shot total. The 1996 competition had added decimal scoring to the final; shots could score up to 10.9 for the final. The total maximum was therefore 709.0. Ties were broken first by final round score. Any pistol was permitted.

Records

The existing world and Olympic records were as follows.

No new world or Olympic records were set during the competition.

Schedule

Results

Qualifying

Final

References

Sources

Shooting at the 2000 Summer Olympics
Men's 2000
Men's events at the 2000 Summer Olympics